Wanq'uni (Aymara wanq'u guinea pig, -ni a suffix, "the one with the guinea pigs", also spelled Huancuni) is a mountain in the Bolivian Andes which reaches a height of approximately . It is located in the Cochabamba Department, Mizque Province, Alalay Municipality. It lies northeast of Inka Pirqa.

References 

Mountains of Cochabamba Department